Lawrence Okolie (born 16 December 1992) is a British Nigerian professional boxer who has held the WBO cruiserweight title since 2021. At regional level, he held the Commonwealth cruiserweight title from 2018 to 2019, and the British and European cruiserweight titles separately in 2019. Okolie is known for his long reach, accurate jab and punching power. As of July 2022, he is ranked as the world's second best active cruiserweight by The Ring magazine third by the Transnational Boxing Rankings Board and BoxRec.

Early life and amateur career
Okolie was born in Hackney, London to Nigerian parents of Igbo descent. He grew up in Stoke Newington and attended Stoke Newington School. He represented Team GB as a heavyweight at the 2016 Rio Olympics.  He beat Igor Pawel Jakubowski from Poland on points and made it to the Round of 16, where he lost to eventual bronze medalist Erislandy Savon of Cuba.

Professional career

Early career
On 18 January 2017, Okolie announced his decision to turn professional, signing with Eddie Hearn and Matchroom Sport to compete in the cruiserweight division.

His first professional fight took place at the Manchester Arena in Manchester on 25 March 2017. It was on the undercard for the Jorge Linares vs. Anthony Crolla lightweight world championship fight. His opponent was 33 year old Geoffrey Cave, who had a record of no wins and two losses. The fight lasted 20 seconds and ended after Okolie landed two right hooks to the head of Cave. The referee stopped the fight immediately. His next bout took place in Glasgow, Scotland at The SSE Hydro on 15 April as part of the undercard for the world Ricky Burns vs. Julius Indongo super lightweight unification fight. He fought 35 year old journeyman Lukasz Rusiewicz. Okolie knocked Rusiewicz down twice in round one en route to a first-round stoppage. The time of stoppage was 2 minutes and 36 seconds.

Okolie was scheduled to fight on the undercard of the mega heavyweight fight Anthony Joshua vs. Wladimir Klitschko on 29 April at the Wembley Stadium in London. On 25 April, it was announced that he would fight Russell Henshaw (7–4, 2 KOs), who he was supposed to fight on his debut. On the night, Okolie tweeted that he would no longer be fighting on the undercard. The reason for this was due to Wembley council having a curfew of 11:00pm and the main event was due to start at 10:00pm. The other fights on the undercard went longer than expected.

Okolie fought on the Kell Brook vs. Errol Spence Jr. IBF world title undercard at Bramall Lane in Sheffield on 27 May, defeating Rudolf Helesic in the first round. Helesic was knocked down twice prior to the stoppage. On 1 July, Okolie recorded his fourth straight first-round stoppage win against Russell Henshaw. The fight was stopped after 2 minutes and 10 seconds into the round.

It was announced that Okolie would appear on the NXTGEN card on 1 September 2017, at the York Hall in London. Other prospects on the card included Conor Benn and fellow Olympians Joshua Buatsi and Joe Cordina. Okolie went the six-round distance for the first time in his career against Blaise Mendouo. He lost one round on the referee's scorecard, winning 59–54. Okolie was also taken past the first round for the first time in his professional career. In round four, Mendouo was dropped by a big right hand. Following the win, Okolie spoke to Sky Sports about going the distance, "It was useful to go the rounds, but was tough against an awkward opponent. It was a little bit scrappy, I couldn't get the rhythm of my opponent. I knew that this guy would be a lot more difficult than some of the other cruiserweight prospects." Okolie next fought on 28 October on the Anthony Joshua vs. Carlos Takam undercard at the Principality Stadium in Cardiff, Wales. His opponent was 36 year old Adam Williams. Okolie stopped Williams in the third round, extending his unbeaten record.

Okolie vs. Chamberlain
Okolie next fought on 13 December 2017, closing off his first year as a professional at the York Hall in London. His opponent was Antonio Sousa in a six-round bout. Starting off with a stiff jab, Okolie dropped Sousa twice in round one and twice in round two before the referee stepped in at 1 minute and 4 seconds. After the fight, speaking on rival Isaac Chamberlain, he said, "He and Ted Bami are two cowards! He's calling me his easiest fight, he's saying stuff online. Here's the fight in February, let's go."

On 19 December, Sky Sports confirmed Okolie would fight Chamberlain on 3 February 2018 at The O2 Arena. The fighters had been calling each other out on social media over the months before the fight was finally signed. In January 2018, the WBA sanctioned the fight for their vacant Continental cruiserweight title. In front of 8,000 fans in attendance, Okolie scored a quick knockdown in the opening round, en route to a dominant one-sided unanimous decision (UD) win to capture the vacant WBA Continental title. In round two, after being warned a number of times, Chamberlain was docked a point for continuous holding. In round six, Okolie landed a right hand to Chamberlain, forcing his glove to touch the canvas for a second knockdown. Okolie also had a point deducted in round nine. After ten rounds, the judges scorecards read 98–89, 97–89 and 96-90 in favour of Okolie. After the fight, Okolie called out Welsh boxer Craig Kennedy (16–1, 8 KOs) for a fight on the Anthony Joshua vs. Joseph Parker undercard. The card averaged 230,000 viewers on Sky Sports.

Okolie vs. Watkins
On 16 April 2018, Commonwealth cruiserweight champion Luke Watkins (13–0, 9 KOs) called out Okolie for a fight in the future. Nine days later, the Swindon Advertiser reported that Okolie's promoter, Eddie Hearn, had given the bout the green light to go ahead. On 26 April, a deal had been agreed for the fight to take place on 6 June at the York Hall in London. Okolie dropped Watkins twice on his way to a third-round stoppage victory. Referee Michael Alexander stopped the fight at 1 minute 40 seconds of the round. After the bout, Hearn stated the Commonwealth mandatory challenger, Wadi Camacho (20–7, 12 KOs), would likely be Okolie's only title defence before moving on to the British and European titles.

Okolie vs. Askin 
On 12 July 2018, the British Boxing Board of Control (BBBofC) ordered for Matty Askin (23–3–1, 15 KOs) to make a mandatory defence of his British cruiserweight title against Okolie by the end of November 2018. A purse bid was set for 8 August. On 7 August, Eddie Hearn announced the fight was confirmed and would take place on the Anthony Joshua vs. Alexander Povetkin undercard on 22 September at the Wembley Stadium in London on Sky Sports Box Office. Prior to the fight being made, Okolie vacated the Commonwealth cruiserweight title. In what was described as an 'ugly fight', Okolie defeated Askin via UD to claim the British cruiserweight title. The final scorecards read 116–110, 114–112 and 114–113 in Okolie's favour. Okolie lost a total of three points in fouls. During the middle rounds there was a lot of holding and wrestling. Okolie began using his head on the inside which resulted in him losing points.

Okolie vs. Ngabu 
On 26 October 2019 Okolie fought Yves Ngabu, ranked #9 by the IBF, #12 by the WBO and #13 by the WBA at cruiserweight. Okolie won the fight via seventh round TKO.

WBO cruiserweight champion

Okolie vs. Jeżewski, Głowacki 

At the WBO federation convention in Tokyo in December 2019, it was decided that the Polish former two-time cruiserweight champion Krzysztof Głowacki would face Okolie for the vacant WBO cruiserweight title, and a bout between them was ordered. They had been scheduled to face each other on the undercard of Anthony Joshua vs. Kubrat Pulev on 12 December 2020, but the fight was postponed when Głowacki tested positive for COVID-19. As a result, Okolie instead faced Nikodem Jeżewski, also from Poland, and he won via second-round technical knockout after dropping Jeżewski three times, winning the vacant WBO International cruiserweight title.

The Okolie vs. Głowacki world title bout was rescheduled for 20 March 2021, and was won by Okolie via sixth-round knockout. Glowacki was ranked #1 by the WBO and #3 by The Ring at cruiserweight. He conveyed his happiness at winning his first world title in his post-fight interview, saying "Obviously I'm happy, I feel blessed... It's amazing to be able to put an exclamation mark on my life with a world title." Okolie also revealed that his promoter Eddie Hearn had made a deal with him, promising to buy him a watch if he succeeded in becoming a world champion: "Four or five years ago, Eddie Hearn saw a boy from Hackney and said 'if you win a world title, I'll buy you a gold Rolex Sky Dweller'. Now I want my Sky Dweller. And he said I'd get another one if I unify, too!"

Okolie vs. Prašović 
Okolie made the first defence of his WBO cruiserweight title against WBO's #1 contender Dilan Prašović on 25 September 2021 on the undercard of Anthony Joshua vs. Oleksandr Usyk. Okolie retained his title, winning by third-round knockout.

Okolie vs. Cieślak 
It was announced on 7 January 2022, that Okolie would make his second WBO title defence against Michał Cieślak, who was at the time the #3 ranked WBO cruiserweight contender, on 27 February 2022. Okolie was seen as the 1/9 favourite to retain his title, while bookmakers had Cieślak as the 9/2 underdog. In a scrappy bout that featured a lot of grappling and rabbit punches, Okolie retained his world title with a unanimous decision victory, with judges' scorecards of 117–110, 116–111 and 115–112 in his favour.

Professional boxing record

References

External links 
 
 Lawrence Okolie - Profile, News Archive & Current Rankings at Box.Live

1992 births
Living people
English male boxers
Olympic boxers of Great Britain
Boxers at the 2016 Summer Olympics
People from Hackney Central
Boxers from Greater London
Alumni of the University of East London
Cruiserweight boxers
British Boxing Board of Control champions
Commonwealth Boxing Council champions
European Boxing Union champions